Tijana Dapčević (born 3 February 1976) is a Macedonian and Serbian singer.

Early life
Tijana Todevska was born in Skopje, at the time part of SFR Yugoslavia, to a Macedonian father Velko Todevski, a music teacher and a Bosnian Serb mother Brana, an opera singer. Her parents studied in Sarajevo, where they met. She has a younger sister Tamara, and is married to Milan Dapčević, a Serbian businessman.

Career
One of her hit songs is "Sve je isto, samo njega nema" (Everything Is the Same, Only He Is Gone), "he" being former President of Yugoslavia Josip Broz Tito. 

She won the Sunčane Skale Festival in Herceg Novi in 2002 with the song "Negativ" (Negative), composed by Darko Dimitrov and included on her eponymous second studio album. She has also won first place on the Serbian Radio Festival-Feras in 2006 with the song "Julijana" (Juliana).

In 2004, Dapčević provided vocals for "Kiša" (Rain), a song by Serbian rapper Dalibor Andonov Gru. Andonov and Dapčević recorded it as a rendition of the track "Kiša", which was originally released on Andonov's 2003 album Beograd (Belgrade). In contrast to the original song, which included solely elements of hip hop, the 2004 rework included motives previously seen in Dapčević's earlier work, dedicated more to pop music.

At the 2006 Evropesma, Tijana was placed in eighth place receiving 27 points with the song "Greh" (Sin). The song was included on her next album Žute minute, which was released in the summer of 2007.

On 28 August 2013, Tijana Dapčević was selected by Macedonian Radio Television to represent Macedonia at the Eurovision Song Contest 2014 in Denmark. Dapčević competed in the second semi-final of the competition on 8 May 2014 with the song "To the Sky". Dapčević placed 13th in the second semi-final with 33 points and did not progress to the final. Tijana's younger sister Tamara has participated in Eurovision Song Contest 2008 and 2019, and was a backing vocalist for Tijana in 2014.

Covers
Some of her songs have been covered in numerous other languages, such as "Sve je isto, samo njega nema" in Polish as Natasza Urbańska's "Mała" (2009) and "Pogrešan čovek" in Croatian as Lidija Bačić's "Krivi čovjek" (2014).

Discography
 Kao da... (2001)
 Negativ (2002)
 Zemlja mojih snova (2004)
 Žuta minuta (2007)
 Muzika (2010)

References

Sources

External links
Official Website

1976 births
Living people
21st-century Macedonian women singers
Macedonian pop singers
21st-century Serbian women singers
Serbian pop singers
Musicians from Skopje
Eurovision Song Contest entrants of 2014
Eurovision Song Contest entrants for North Macedonia
Macedonian emigrants to Serbia
Naturalized citizens of Serbia
Macedonian people of Serbian descent
Macedonian people of Bosnia and Herzegovina descent
Serbian people of Macedonian descent
Serbian people of Bosnia and Herzegovina descent
Pesma za Evroviziju contestants